Manassinakkare (Beyond the Mind) is a 2003 Indian Malayalam family drama film directed by Sathyan Anthikkad and written by Ranjan Pramod. It stars Jayaram, Sheela, and Nayanthara in the lead, while Innocent, Oduvil Unnikrishnan, K. P. A. C. Lalitha, Siddique, Sukumari, Nedumudi Venu, and Mammukoya play other prominent roles. The film's score and soundtrack were composed by Ilayaraja. The film marked the return of Sheela as an actress and the film debut of Nayanthara. It won four awards at Filmfare Awards South.

Plot 
Kochu Thresia is a rich widow living a retired life in a quaint but beautiful village filled with eclectic characters. Living with her are her eldest son and family. Her son and daughter-in-law are tired of Kochu's eccentricities, which they consider bad behavior for a woman of her age; they think she is a nuisance who creates unnecessary trouble for them in their busy lives. Though old, Kochu is still young at heart and knows how to enjoy life, getting into humorous predicaments which further incense her grown-up children. She then meets the young, down-to-earth Reji, in whom she finds a sympathetic and understanding friend, and starts seeing him like a son. Reji eagerly fulfills her wishes, including riding on an elephant, and they enjoy their time together. However, as troubles occur on the way and her children dislike her presence in the family, Kochu decides these problems must be ended.

Cast

 Jayaram as Reji
 Sheela as Kochu Thresia
 Nayanthara as Gauri 
 Innocent as Chacko Mappila
 Siddique as Tony Kombanakkadan
 KPAC Lalitha as Kunju Maria
 Oduvil Unnikrishnan as Sreedharan
 Sukumari as Shanthamma
 Nedumudi Venu as  Kuriakose
 Sona Nair as Sherin Kuriakose, Kochu Tresia's daughter
 Madhupal as Benny Kombanakkadan
 Rajesh Hebbar as Joy Kombanakkadan
 Reshmi Nambiar as Molikutty, Tony's wife
 Reena as Sherly Kombanakkadan
 Anitha Nair  as Reetha Joy
 Mamukoya as Kunji Khadir
 T. P. Madhavan
 Santhakumari
 Manikandan Pattambi
 Joju George as a politician
 Shivaji
 Ottapalam Pappan
 Dinesh Prabhakar as Rameshan
 Vijayan Peringod as Kelu Police
 Prem Nazir as Mathukkutty (Uncredited)

Production
Manassinakkare was Nayanthara's debut film. During pre-production, Sathyan cast every major character except the role of Gauri, for which he sought a newcomer to keep Sheela as the major attraction in the cast. Filming was in Pattambi, Palakkad, with the major location being the house of Kochu Thresia. Since Gauri's scenes were not involved in the house, Sathyan started filming hoping he could find a cast before wrapping. During one of the filming days, he was reading Vanitha magazine and was struck by Nayanthara's picture in a jewellery advertisement. She was contacted and cast as Gauri.

Soundtrack

The film features songs composed by Ilaiyaraaja and written by Gireesh Puthenchery.

Reception
A critic from Deccan Herald wrote: "Shot mostly around the beautiful locations of Pattambi, Sathyan Anthikad's Manassinakkare is a beautiful mix of emotional situations and comic interlude".

Box office
The film was a commercial success and ran for more than 200 days in theatres.

Awards
Filmfare Awards South
 Best Film - Maha Subair (producer of the film)
 Best Director - Sathyan Anthikkad
 Best Music Director - Ilaiyaraaja
 Best Actor - Jayaram

Asianet Film Awards
 Best Director - Sathyan Anthikkad
 Best Male Playback Singer - M. G. Sreekumar
 Best Makeup Artist - Pandyan
 Best New Face of the Year - (Female) - Nayanthara
Kerala Film Critics Awards
Best Dubbing Artist Female - Sreeja for Nayantara

References

External links

2003 films
2000s Malayalam-language films
Indian family films
Indian drama films
Films shot in Palakkad
Films shot in Munnar
Films directed by Sathyan Anthikad
Films scored by Ilaiyaraaja